Ukrainian Canadians  are Canadian citizens of Ukrainian descent or Ukrainian-born people who immigrated to Canada. In 2016, there were an estimated 1,359,655 persons of full or partial Ukrainian origin residing in Canada (the majority being Canadian-born citizens), making them Canada's eleventh largest ethnic group and giving Canada the world's third-largest Ukrainian population behind Ukraine itself and Russia. Self-identified Ukrainians are the plurality in several rural areas of Western Canada. According to the 2011 census, of the 1,251,170 who identified as Ukrainian, only 144,260 (or 11.5%) could speak the Ukrainian language (including the Canadian Ukrainian dialect).

History

Unconfirmed settlement before 1891
Minority opinions among historians of Ukrainians in Canada surround theories that a small number of Ukrainians settled in Canada before 1891. Most controversial is the claim that Ukrainians may have been infantrymen alongside Poles in the Swiss French “De Watteville's Regiment” who fought for the British on the Niagara Peninsula during the War of 1812 – it has been theorized that Ukrainians were among those soldiers who decided to stay in Upper Canada (southern Ontario). Other Ukrainians supposedly arrived as part of other immigrant groups; it has been claimed that individual Ukrainian families may have settled in southern Manitoba in the mid- to late 1870s alongside block settlements of Mennonites and other Germans from the Russian Empire. "Galicians" are noted as being among the miners of the British Columbia gold rushes and figure prominently in some towns in that new province's first census in 1871 (these may have been Poles and Belarusians as well as Ukrainians). Because there is so little definitive documentary evidence of individual Ukrainians among these three groups, they are not generally regarded as among the first Ukrainians in Canada.

First wave: Settlers, 1891–1914

During the nineteenth century the territory inhabited by Ukrainians in Europe was divided between the Austro-Hungarian and Russian empires. The Austrian crownlands of Galicia and Bukovina were home to many Ukrainian speakers. Austrian Galicia was one of the poorest and most overpopulated regions in Europe, and had experienced a series of blights and famines. Emigration on a large scale from Galicia to the Balkans (the north-south border region of Croatia and Bosnia) and even to Brazil was already underway by 1891.

The first wave of Ukrainian immigration to Canada began with Iwan (Ivan) Pylypow and Wasyl (Vasyl) Eleniak, who arrived in 1891, and brought several families to settle in 1892. Pylypow helped found the Edna-Star Settlement east of Edmonton, the first and largest Ukrainian block settlement. However, it is Dr. Josef Oleskow, along with Cyril Genik, who are considered responsible for the large Ukrainian Canadian population through their promotion of Canada as a destination for immigrants from western (Austrian-ruled) Ukraine in the late 1890s. Ukrainians from Central Ukraine, which was ruled by the Russian monarchy, also came to Canada – but in smaller numbers than those from Galicia and Bukovina. Approximately 170,000 Ukrainians from the Austro-Hungarian Empire arrived in Canada from September 1891 to August 1914.

Clifford Sifton, Canada's Minister of the Interior from 1896 to 1905, also encouraged Ukrainians from Austria-Hungary to immigrate to Canada since he wanted new agricultural immigrants to populate Canada's prairies. After retirement, Sifton defended the new Ukrainian and East European immigrants to Canada – who were not from the United Kingdom, the United States, Scandinavia, Iceland, France or Germany – by stating: 

This Ukrainian immigration to Canada was largely agrarian, and at first Ukrainian Canadians concentrated in distinct block settlements in the parkland belt of the prairie provinces: Alberta, Saskatchewan, and Manitoba. While the Canadian Prairies are often compared to the steppes of Ukraine, the settlers came largely from Galicia and Bukovina – which are not steppe lands, but are semi-wooded areas in the foothills of the Carpathian Mountains. This is why Ukrainians coming to Canada settled in the wooded aspen parklands – in an arch from Winnipeg and Stuartburn, Manitoba to Edmonton and Leduc, Alberta – rather than the open prairies further south. Furthermore, the semi-feudal nature of land ownership in the Austrian Empire meant that in the "Old Country" people had to pay the pan (landlord) for all their firewood and lumber for building. Upon arriving in Canada, the settlers often demanded wooded land from federal Dominion Lands Act registry officials so that they would be able to supply their own needs, even if this meant taking land that was less productive for crops. They also attached deep importance to settling near to family, people from nearby villages or other culturally similar groups, furthering the growth of the block settlements.

Fraternal and benevolent organizations established by these settlers include the Ukrainian Labour Farmer Temple Association (ULFTA, affiliated with the Communist Party of Canada), the Ukrainian Catholic Brotherhood (UCB, affiliated with the Ukrainian Catholic Church in Canada), and the Ukrainian Self-Reliance League (USRL, affiliated with the Ukrainian Orthodox Church of Canada). The ULFTA transformed itself into the Association of United Ukrainian Canadians in 1946, the UCB and USRL are member organizations of the Ukrainian Canadian Congress today.

By 1914, there were also growing communities of Ukrainian immigrants in eastern Canadian cities, such as Toronto, Montreal, Hamilton, and Windsor. Many of them arrived from the provinces of Podillia, Volhynia, Kyiv and Bessarabia in Russian-ruled Ukraine. In the early years of settlement, Ukrainian immigrants faced considerable amounts of discrimination at the hands of Northern European Canadians, an example of which was the internment.

Internment (1914–1920)

From 1914 to 1920, the political climate of the First World War allowed the Canadian Government to classify immigrants with Austro-Hungarian citizenship as "aliens of enemy nationality". This classification, authorized by the August 1914 War Measures Act, permitted the government to legally compel thousands of Ukrainians in Canada to register with federal authorities. About 5,000 Ukrainian men, and some women and children, were interned at government camps and work sites. Although many Ukrainians were "paroled" into jobs for private companies by 1917, the internment continued until June 20, 1920 – almost a year after the Treaty of Versailles was signed by Canada on June 28, 1919.

There are some two dozen Ukrainian-specific plaques and memorials in Canada commemorating Canada's first national internment operations, including several statues – on the fairgrounds of Canada's National Ukrainian Festival south of Dauphin, Manitoba, the grounds of the Manitoba Legislative Building in Winnipeg; and at the locations of the former internment camps in Banff National Park, Alberta, Spirit Lake (La Ferme), Quebec, and Kapuskasing, Ontario. Most were placed by the Ukrainian Canadian Civil Liberties Association (UCCLA) and its supporters. On August 24, 2005, Prime Minister Paul Martin recognized the Ukrainian Canadian internment as a "dark chapter" in Canadian history, and pledged $2.5 million to fund memorials and educational exhibits although that funding was never provided.

On May 9, 2008, following the 2005 passage of Inky Mark's Bill C-331, the Government of Canada, under Prime Minister Stephen Harper, established a $10 million fund following several months of negotiation with the Ukrainian Canadian community's representatives, including the UCCLA, Ukrainian Canadian Congress and Ukrainian Canadian Foundation of Taras Shevchenko (also known as the Shevchenko Foundation), establishing the Canadian First World War Internment Recognition Fund (CFWWIRF). The Endowment Council of the CFWWIRF uses the interest earned on that amount to fund projects that commemorate the experience of Ukrainians and other Europeans interned between 1914 and 1920. The funds are held in trust by the Shevchenko Foundation. Amongst the commemorative projects funded by the Endowment Council was the unveiling, simultaneously across Canada, of 115 bilingual plaques on August 24, 2014, recalling the 100th anniversary of the first implementation of the War Measures Act. This was known as Project "Сто" ( Sto; meaning "one hundred"), and organized by the UCCLA.

Second wave: Settlers, workers and professionals, 1923–1939

In 1923, the Canadian government modified the Immigration Act to allow former subjects of the Austrian Empire to once again enter Canada – and Ukrainian immigration started anew. Ukrainians from western Volhynia – the Polesie and Wołyń Voivodeships (under Polish rule), and southern Bessarabia – also known as the Budjak (under Romanian rule), joined a new wave of emigrants from Polish-governed Galicia and Romanian-governed Bukovina. Around 70,000 Ukrainians from Poland, Romania, and Czechoslovakia arrived in Canada from 1923 to September 1939, although the flow decreased severely after 1930 due to the Great Depression.

Relatively little farmland remained unclaimed – the majority in the Peace River region of northwestern Alberta – and less than half of this group settled as farmers in the Prairie provinces. The majority became workers in the growing industrial centres of southern Ontario, the Montreal region and the Eastern Townships of Quebec; the mines, smelters and forests of northern Ontario; and the small heavy industries of urban western Canada. A few Ukrainian professionals and intellectuals were accepted into Canada at this time; they later became leaders in the Ukrainian Canadian community.

The second wave was heavily influenced by the struggle for Ukrainian independence during the Russian Civil War, and established two competing fraternal / benevolent organizations in Canada: the United Hetman Organization (UHO) in 1934 – which supported the idea of a Ukrainian "Cossack kingdom" led by Pavlo Skoropadskyi; and the rival Ukrainian National Federation (UNF) in 1932 – which supported the idea of an independent Ukrainian republic and politically supported the armed Ukrainian nationalist insurgency in Polish-occupied Western Ukraine. The UHO ceased to exist by 1960, while the UNF continued to expand and became the largest and most influential Ukrainian organization in Canada, spearheading the creation of the coordinating Ukrainian Canadian Committee (later Ukrainian Canadian Congress) during World War II.

Third wave: Workers, professionals and political refugees, 1945–1952

From World War II to 1991, most Ukrainians coming to Canada were political refugees and Displaced Persons who tended to move to cities in southern Ontario, southern Quebec and the Lower Mainland of British Columbia – there are now large Ukrainian communities in Toronto, Montreal and Vancouver. They established a number of new organizations and affiliated newspapers, women's and youth groups, the most prominent of which was the Canadian League for the Liberation of Ukraine (renamed the League of Ukrainian Canadians after the collapse of the USSR in 1991). The League joined the Ukrainian Canadian Committee (later Ukrainian Canadian Congress) as a member organization in 1959.

Relatively few Ukrainians came to Canada during the Brezhnev and Gorbachev years, as exit visas could take several years to get approved.

Fourth wave: Post-independence immigrants and recent refugees, 1991–present

After the dissolution of the USSR, emigration from Ukraine increased. Rising levels of corruption, the dismantlement of some social services, low-paying employment and loss of jobs in Ukraine, made immigration attractive once again.

Participation in the Canadian economy
In the first half of the twentieth century, Ukrainian Canadians overwhelmingly earned their livings in primary industry – predominantly in agriculture, but also in mining, logging, construction, and the extension of the Canadian railway system; most importantly as labour in completing the transcontinental mainlines of the Canadian Northern Railway and Grand Trunk Pacific, both then nationalized and consolidated into the Canadian National Railway (CN). As agriculture became more mechanized and consolidated, male Ukrainian Canadians shifted into non-farm primary and secondary industry jobs, while women took jobs in domestic work and unskilled service industries. By 1971, only slightly more Ukrainian Canadians worked in agriculture than in the wider Canadian labour force. While they remain somewhat over-represented in agriculture today (7% versus 4% of all working Canadians) and underrepresented in elite managerial positions, Ukrainian Canadians have largely assimilated more into the broader economy, such that the Ukrainian Canadian workforce is now similar to that of Canada as a whole in nearly all other respects.

Demography

Population

Language 

In addition to the official English and French languages, many prairie public schools offer Ukrainian language education for children, including immersion programs. Generally second language students are taught the local Canadian Ukrainian dialect, rather than Standard Ukrainian.

The Canadian Ukrainian dialect is based on the Ukrainian spoken by the first wave of immigrants from the Austro-Hungarian Empire from 1891 to 1914. Because the Ukrainian language of this era had no words for such things as agricultural machinery other than a plow, words for wildlife or vegetation common to North America and uncommon in Ukraine, words related to the automobile or other self-propelled vehicles on roads, or words for internal combustion engine-powered or electrically-powered tools or home appliances of any kind, extensive borrowings and adaptations from Canadian English were independently made by Ukrainian settlers in the block settlements of the Prairies during their first decades in Canada. The decline of regular communication with relatives in Ukraine, especially the severe restrictions between 1939 and 1989, further isolated the Western Canadian Ukrainian dialect from an evolving Ukrainian language in Soviet Ukraine. Now, immigrants from Ukraine to Western Canada since 1991, speaking Ukrainian, find the Canadian Ukrainian dialect old-fashioned and sometimes strange, for modern Ukrainian no longer uses some of the expressions and vocabulary common to the Canadian dialect – or, in the case of the Canadian loan words and adaptations, never did use, because Standard Ukrainian either invented other terms or borrowed and adapted from other languages, such as French, German or Russian.

There are a few Ukrainian Catholic elementary schools in the Greater Toronto Area, including St. Demetrius Catholic Elementary school, St. Josaphat Catholic Elementary school, and Josef Cardinal Slipyj Elementary school, all in Etobicoke; as well as St. Sofia Catholic Elementary school in Mississauga.

Religion 

Most Ukrainians who came to Canada from Galicia were Ukrainian Catholic and those from Bukovina were Ukrainian Orthodox. However, people of both churches faced a shortage of priests in Canada. The Ukrainian Catholic clergy came into conflict with the Roman Catholic hierarchy because they were not celibate and wanted a separate governing structure. At the time, the Russian Orthodox Church was the only Orthodox Christian church that operated in North America – because they had arrived first via Alaska, and traditionally Orthodox churches are territorially exclusive. However, Ukrainians in Canada were suspicious of being controlled from Russia, first by the Tsarist government and later by the Soviets. Partially in response to this, the Ukrainian Orthodox Church of Canada was created as a wholly Ukrainian Canadian-controlled alternative. As well, the Ukrainian Catholic clergy were eventually given a separate structure from the Roman Church.

Geographical distribution

Provinces & territories

Cities 

The provinces with the largest Ukrainian populations (single and multiple origins, 2006) are Ontario, 336,355; Alberta, 332,180; British Columbia, 197,265; Manitoba, 167,175; Saskatchewan 129,265; and Quebec, 31,955. In terms of proportion of the total population, the most Ukrainian provinces and territories are Manitoba (15%), Saskatchewan (13%), Alberta (10%), Yukon (5%), British Columbia (5%), and Ontario (3%).

The metropolitan regions with the largest Ukrainian populations (single and multiple origins, 2006) are Edmonton, 144,620; Toronto, 122,510; Winnipeg, 110,335; Vancouver, 81,725; Calgary, 76,240; Saskatoon, 38,825; Hamilton, 27,080; Montreal, 26,150; Regina, 25,725; Ottawa-Gatineau, 21,520; St. Catharines-Niagara, 20,990; Thunder Bay, 17,620; Victoria, 15,020; Kelowna, 13,425; Oshawa, 12,555; London, 10,765; and Kitchener 10,425.

The Census Divisions with the largest percentage of Ukrainians (single and multiple origins, 2006) are Manitoba #12 (25%), Alberta #10 (20%), Alberta #12 (19%), Manitoba #11 (15%), Manitoba #7 (13%), Manitoba #10 (12%), Manitoba #9 (12%), Manitoba #2 (10%).

There are a number of smaller rural communities in Western Canada with significant proportions of Ukrainians (single and multiple origins, 2016), including: Canora, Saskatchewan (52.6%), Speers, Saskatchewan (50%), Andrew, Alberta (48%), Mundare, Alberta (46%), Bradwell, Saskatchewan (41%), Vilna, Alberta (40%), Smoky Lake, Alberta (39%), Hafford, Saskatchewan (39%).

Culture 

Having been separated from Ukraine, Ukrainian Canadians have developed their own distinctive Ukrainian culture in Canada. To showcase their unique hybrid culture, Ukrainian Canadians have created institutions that showcase Ukrainian Canadian culture such as Edmonton's Cheremosh and Shumka troupes – among the world's elite Ukrainian dancers; or the Ukrainian Cultural Heritage Village – where Ukrainian pioneer buildings are displayed along with extensive cultural exhibits.

Ukrainian Canadians have also contributed to Canadian culture as a whole. Actress and comedian Luba Goy, singer Gloria Kaye, Jeopardy! host Alex Trebek, hockey executive Kyle Dubas, and painter William Kurelek, for example, are well known outside the Ukrainian community.

Perhaps one of the most lasting contributions Ukrainian Canadians have made to the wider culture of Canada is the concept of multiculturalism, which was promoted as early as 1963 by Senator Paul Yuzyk. During and after the debates surrounding the Royal Commission on Bilingualism and Biculturalism, Ukrainian leaders, such as linguist Jaroslav Rudnyckyj, came out in force against the idea of English – French biculturalism, which they believed denied the contributions other peoples had made to Canada. Partly in response to this, Prime Minister Pierre Trudeau shifted Canada to a policy of official multiculturalism; notably, the day after the Canadian Multiculturalism Policy of 1971 was officially announced, Trudeau gave a forceful speech in support of the policy at a national assembly of the Ukrainian Canadian Congress in Winnipeg.

Architecture

The Western Ukrainian agricultural settlers brought with them a style of folk architecture dominated by buildings made of unprocessed logs, which were much better suited to the wooded parkland belt rather than the "bald prairie". The first house built – usually a burdei – used some sod; but was not exactly a sod hut, more like a dugout. The second house was often a white-washed and plastered log cabin usually with thatched roof, very similar to those seen in Ukraine. Barns, chicken coops, granaries, and so on were all built using the same techniques as the houses. By the 1930s most Ukrainian Canadians adopted the building styles of the North American mainstream including framed homes and barns built from commercial plans and using milled lumber.

Early churches, built by pioneer farmers rather than trained builders, were basically log cabins with a few added decorations. They aspired to the designs of Ukraine's wooden churches, but were much more humble. Latter churches – such as the "prairie cathedral" style of Father Philip Ruh, using a mixture of Byzantine and Western influences – were much more decorative.

Politics
Many Ukrainians fled Russia, Poland, and later, the Soviet Union, to find freedom and a better life in Canada. For them Canada became "an anti-Russia", where they could realize their political and economic ideas. Most Ukrainian Canadians were anti-Soviet, yet a minor group of Ukrainians has since 1910 supported Canadian socialism and contributed to the formation of the Communist Party of Canada, and formed a significant bloc within that group. They were also active in other Marxist organizations like the Ukrainian Labour Farmer Temple Association (ULFTA). Ukrainians also played a central role in the 1930s formation of the Co-operative Commonwealth Federation (CCF) and the 1960s formation of the New Democratic Party. Ukrainians were a notable portion of the Mackenzie–Papineau Battalion of Canadians who volunteered and fought in the Spanish Civil War on the side of the leftist republican government against the nationalist troops of Generalísimo Francisco Franco.

Ukrainians in Canada at first supported the Liberal Party federally and provincially, a minority moved towards the 1930s protest parties of Social Credit and the CCF federally and provincially. The vocal anti-communism of John Diefenbaker in the 1950s led the more nationalist-minded to support the federal Progressive Conservatives. Today's Ukrainian community tends to vote based on economic class interests and regional preferences.

The nationalist movement, through the Ukrainian National Federation and the Canadian League for the Liberation of Ukraine, was also an important part of the community. After Ukraine became independent Canada was one of the first nations to recognize Ukraine. From 1992 to 1994, Ukrainian Canadians were vital in fundraising to purchase a building in Ottawa to house the Embassy of Ukraine. As well, Canada has recognized the Holodomor (Ukrainian Famine) as an act of genocide. Canada also sent many observers to Ukraine during the disputed 2004 presidential election (see: Orange Revolution). The Government of Canada as well as its provincial governments – especially the Ukrainian strongholds in Alberta, Manitoba and Saskatchewan – do much to support Ukraine's economic and political development.

The Ukrainian Canadians had and have much more influence in Canadian society and policy than any other East European group; therefore they have had several prominent figures in top positions. Ray Hnatyshyn was the 24th Governor General of Canada (1990–1995) and the first Governor General of Ukrainian descent. Ukrainians were also elected leaders of Canada's prairie provinces: Gary Filmon was Premier of Manitoba (1988–1999), nearly simultaneously with Hnatyshyn, and Roy Romanow was Premier of Saskatchewan (1991–2001), also partly at the same time as Filmon and Hnatyshyn.

Ed Stelmach became Premier of Alberta in 2006 as the third provincial premier of Ukrainian descent. He succeeded Ralph Klein (1992–2006), who had cabinets with many Ukrainian ministers. Stelmach himself is the grandson of Ukrainian immigrants and speaks fluent Ukrainian. He left office in October 2011.

Chrystia Freeland, the Liberal Deputy Prime Minister of Canada, is of Ukrainian descent and speaks Ukrainian. Rona Ambrose (née Chapchuk), who was Leader of the Opposition and interim Conservative party leader from 2015 to 2017, is of Ukrainian descent.

Arts

Canada is home to some very vibrant Ukrainian dance groups. Some examples of Ukrainian dance ensembles in Canada are the Ukrainian Shumka Dancers and the Cheremosh Ukrainian Dance Company in Edmonton, the Rusalka Ukrainian Dance Ensemble and Rozmai Ukrainian Dance Company in Winnipeg, the Svitanok Ukrainian Dance Ensemble in Ottawa, and hundreds of other groups.

The Ukrainian Canadian Foundation of Taras Shevchenko provides some financial support for Ukrainian Canadian performing, literary and visual arts.

Ukrainians in general are noted for their elaborately decorated Easter Eggs or pysanky, and that is also true in Canada. The world's second largest pysanka is in Vegreville, Alberta.

Ukrainian Canadian churches are also famous for their onion domes, which have elaborately painted murals on their interior, and for their iconostasis, or icon walls.

Music
Ukrainian Canadian musicians and groups include Randy Bachman, the Canadian Bandurist Capella, Ron Cahute, Rick Danko, Victor Mishalow, Chantal Kreviazuk, Gordie Johnson, Canadian Idol season 2 runner-up Theresa Sokyrka, Zirka from Toronto, and Rushnychok from Montreal. The Edmonton-based group the Kubasonics focuses on a folk fusion of traditional Ukrainian music with modern touches.

Food

Cultural food is an important part of Ukrainian culture. Special foods used at Easter as well as Christmas are not made at any other time of the year. In fact on Christmas Eve (January 6 in the Gregorian calendar), a special twelve-dish meatless meal is served. The best-known foods are borshch (a vegetable soup, usually with beets), holobtsi (cabbage rolls), pyrohy or varenyky (dumplings often called "perogies"), and kovbasa (sausage).

Several items of Ukrainian food and culture have been enshrined with roadside attractions throughout the Prairie provinces. These are celebrated in the polka Giants of the Prairies by the Kubasonics. For example, the world's largest perogy is in Glendon, Alberta, and the world's biggest kovbasa is in Mundare, Alberta.

Institutions
There are a number of Ukrainian Canadian institutions, such as:
 the Ukrainian Canadian Congress – a national umbrella organization, established in 1940, represents the Ukrainian Canadian community. The UCC has branches and provincial councils across the country and has dozens of member organizations. The UCC leads and represents the Ukrainian Canadian community to the government of Canada and to the provincial governments.
 the Ukrainian National Federation of Canada, the largest Ukrainian Canadian organization founded in Edmonton in 1932 to unite Ukrainian Canadians on a non-sectarian basis for the prime objectives of preserving Ukrainian language and culture in Canada, promoting good citizenship, and supporting the establishment of an independent and democratic Ukrainian state. The UNF is a member of the Ukrainian Canadian Congress.
 the Ukrainian Canadian Civil Liberties Association, an independent group dedicated to the articulation and defence of the Ukrainian Canadian community's interests
 the Association of United Ukrainian Canadians, the main pro-Communist cultural association
 the Canadian Institute of Ukrainian Studies, jointly at the University of Alberta in Edmonton and the University of Toronto
 St. Andrew's College – the seminary of the Ukrainian Orthodox Church of Canada (affiliated with the University of Manitoba in Winnipeg) and a non-profit university student residence, Ukrainian culture summer school, and youth hostel
 the Ukrainian Museum of Canada, based in Saskatoon with branches in the other major cities of western Canada (Winnipeg, Regina, Edmonton, Calgary and Vancouver) and Toronto
 the Ukrainian Cultural and Educational Centre (also known as "Oseredok") in Winnipeg
 the Ukrainian Cultural Heritage Village, a living-history museum approximately 39 kilometres east of Edmonton
 the Ukrainian Canadian Foundation of Taras Shevchenko (Shevchenko Foundation) – based in Winnipeg, provides some financial support through grants for Ukrainian Canadian performing, literary and visual arts.
 the Centre for Ukrainian Canadian Studies at the University of Manitoba
 the Ukrainian Cultural Centre of Toronto (UCCT)
 the Kule Folklore Centre at the University of Alberta
 the Ukrainian Canadian Archives & Museum of Alberta in Edmonton
 the Prairie Centre for the Study of Ukrainian Heritage at the University of Saskatchewan in Saskatoon
 the Kobzar Literary Award, a biennial literary award that "recognizes outstanding contributions to Canadian literary arts by authors who develop a Ukrainian Canadian theme with literary merit".
 the St. Petro Mohyla Institute in Saskatoon – a non-profit university student residence, Ukrainian culture summer school, and youth hostel.
 the Ukrainian Canadian Students' Union (SUSK/СУСК), a national organization of students at post-secondary institutions
 the Canadian Ukrainian Immigrant Aid Society, a community agency providing settlement assistance for newcomers to Canada
 Ukrainian Canadian Social Services, a community agency providing nutritional and financial assistance to newly-arrived immigrants and Ukrainian Canadian senior citizens.
 the Taras Shevchenko Museum in Toronto
 the Ivan Franko Museum inside the Ukrainian Labour Temple of Winnipeg

Gallery

See also 

 List of Ukrainian Canadians
 List of Canadian place names of Ukrainian origin
 Canada–Ukraine relations
 European Canadians
 Toronto Ukrainian Genealogy Group

Notes

Footnotes

References 

 
 Martynowych, Orest (2011). "The Seraphimite, Independent Greek, Presbyterian and United Churches". Centre for Ukrainian Canadian Studies, University of Manitoba.
 
  [United States – ed.]

Further reading 

 Hoppe, Hans-Joachim Ukraine's conflict and the Ukrainian diaspora in Canada, Kyiv Post, September 5, 2015.
 Kordan, Bohdan and Luciuk, Lubomyr, eds. (1986). A Delicate and Difficult Question: Documents in the History of Ukrainians in Canada, 1899–1962, Kingston: Limestone Press. .
 Kordan, Bohdan (2000). Ukrainian Canadians and the Canada Census, 1981–1996, Saskatoon: Heritage Press. .
 Kordan, Bohdan (2001). Canada and the Ukrainian Question, 1939–1945, Montreal-Kingston: McGill-Queen's University Press. .
 Kukushkin, Vadim (2007). From Peasants to Labourers: Ukrainian and Belarusian Immigration from the Russian Empire to Canada, Montreal: McGill-Queen's University Press. excerpt and text search
 Kulyk-Keefer, Janice (2005). Dark Ghost in the Corner: Imagining Ukrainian-Canadian Identity, Saskatoon: Heritage Press. .
 
 Luciuk, Lubomyr  and Kordan, Bohdan (1989). Creating a Landscape: A Geography of Ukrainians in Canada, Toronto: University of Toronto Press. .
 Luciuk, Lubomyr and Hryniuk, Stella, eds. (1991). Canada's Ukrainians: Negotiating an Identity, Toronto: University of Toronto Press. .
 
 Lupul, Manoly, ed. (1984). Visible Symbols: Cultural Expression Among Canada's Ukrainians, Edmonton: Canadian Institute of Ukrainian Studies Press. .
 Lupul, Manoly, (1982) A Heritage in Transition: Essays on the History of Ukrainians in Canada
 Martynowych, Orest (1991). Ukrainians in Canada: The formative period, 1891–1924. Edmonton: Canadian Institute of Ukrainian Studies Press. .
 Martynowych, Orest (ed.) (2011). "Ukrainian-Canadian History, 1891–Present: A List of English-language Secondary Sources (Monographs, Book chapters, Collections, Articles)." Centre for Ukrainian Canadian Studies University of Manitoba.
 Melnycky, Peter. "'Canadians and Ukrainians Inseparably': Recent Writing on the History of Ukrainian Settlement in Canada," Manitoba History, Number 24, Autumn 1992 online edition, historiography
 Petelycky, Stefan (1999). Into Auschwitz, For Ukraine. Kingston-Kyiv: Kashtan Press. . online edition
 Prymak, Thomas M. (1988). Maple Leaf and Trident: The Ukrainian Canadians During the Second World War. Toronto: Multicultural History Society of Ontario.
 Satzewich, Vic (2002). The Ukrainian Diaspora. Routledge. .
 Swyripa, Frances (1993). Wedded to the Cause: Ukrainian-Canadian Women and Ethnic Identity, 1891–1991
 Swyripa, Frances (1999). Ukrainians. Encyclopedia of Canada's Peoples. Toronto: Multicultural History Society of Ontario.
 Swyripa, Frances and John Herd Thompson, eds. (1983) Loyalties in Conflict: Ukrainians in Canada During the Great War 213pp; 8 essays by scholars
 Yuzyk, Paul. "The First Ukrainians in Manitoba" Manitoba Historical Society Transactions, Series 3, 1951–52 online
 Зав'ялов А. В. Соціальна адаптація українських іммігрантів : монографія / А. В. Зав'ялов. — Київ : Саміт-книга, 2020. — 180 с.

External links 
 Ukrainian Canadian Congress
 Ukrainian diaspora in Canada and U.S.
 Ukrainian Canadian Civil Liberties Association
 Canadian First World War Internment Recognition Fund
 Ukrainian Museum of Canada in Saskatoon
 Ukrainian Cultural and Educational Centre "Oseredok", Winnipeg
 Canadian Institute of Ukrainian Studies
 Kule Folklore Centre at the University of Alberta
 Ukrainian Language Education Centre, University of Alberta, Edmonton
 Ukrainian Canadian Archives & Museum of Alberta, Edmonton
 Ukrainian Cultural Heritage Village, Alberta
 Ukrainian Canadian Foundation of Taras Shevchenko
 Centre for Ukrainian Canadian Studies, University of Manitoba, Winnipeg
 Canadian Ukrainian Immigrant Aid Society
 Ukrainian Canadian Social Services
 The John Luczkiw Collection, University of Toronto
 The Ukrainian Collection of the University of Calgary
  Taras Shevchenko Museum in Toronto
 Final Report of the 1985–1986 Deschênes Commission

European Canadian
 
 
Ukrainian
Canada